WASC (1530 AM) is a daytime-only American radio station located in Spartanburg, South Carolina. The station is licensed by the Federal Communications Commission (FCC) to broadcast on 1530 AM.

History
In 1985, WASC attempted to move to 760 AM.  However, when the FCC granted WCIS in Morganton, North Carolina a license to broadcast on 760 AM, they also denied WASC's attempt to change frequencies.

References

External links

ASC
Urban oldies radio stations in the United States
Radio stations established in 1968
1968 establishments in South Carolina
ASC